The Chinh–Hunnicutt affair, referred to in the Pentagon Papers, was a 1966 scandal concerning the proper role of U.S. military advisors during the Vietnam War. Colonel Cecil F. Hunnicutt, the senior advisor to the ARVN 25th Division, was accused of misusing his position for:

...trying to have the CG removed, of attempting to dismiss other division officers, of bypassing the chain of command, and of destroying the "spirit of cooperation between Americans and Vietnamese."

References

1966 in military history
1966 in South Vietnam
1966 in the United States
20th-century scandals
Political scandals in the United States